Ernest Claudius Bramhall Ford (23 July 1855 – 19 June 1900) was an English cricketer. Ford was a right-handed batsman who fielded as a wicket-keeper. He was born at Cheltenham, Gloucestershire, and was educated a Clifton College.

Ford made his first-class debut for Gloucestershire against Surrey at The Oval in 1874. He made five further first-class appearances for the county, the last of which came against Sussex in 1875 at the County Ground, Hove. In his six first-class matches, he scored a total of 75 runs at an average of 10.71, with a high score of 32 not out.

He died at Southend-on-Sea, Essex, on 19 June 1900.

References

External links
Ernest Ford at ESPNcricinfo
Ernest Ford at CricketArchive

1855 births
1900 deaths
Sportspeople from Cheltenham
People educated at Clifton College
English cricketers
Gloucestershire cricketers
Wicket-keepers